Sally Anne Magnusson (born 1955) is a Scottish broadcast journalist, television presenter and writer, who currently presents the Thursday and Friday night edition of BBC Scotland's Reporting Scotland. She also presents Tracing Your Roots on BBC Radio 4 and was one of the main presenters of the long-running religious television programme Songs of Praise.

Early life
Magnusson was born in 1955 in the city of Glasgow. She is the eldest daughter of Magnus Magnusson, an Icelandic-born broadcaster and writer, and Mamie Baird, a newspaper journalist from Rutherglen. Her maternal uncle, Archie Baird, was a Scottish footballer, who played for Aberdeen and St Johnstone. Magnusson's paternal grandfather, Sigursteinn Magnusson, opened an office to handle fish exports to Europe in Edinburgh. 

She spent her early years in Garrowhill in Glasgow, before moving to Rutherglen, where she grew up with her younger siblings Margaret, Anna, Jon and Siggy. The family later moved to rural area of Balmore, just north of Glasgow. In May 1973, Magnusson's youngest brother, Siggy, died aged 12 three days after being hit by a lorry.

Education 
Magnusson was educated at Laurel Bank School for Girls, a former independent school which later merged with another independent school, The Park School, to form Laurel Park School, itself to merge in 2001 into Hutchesons' Grammar School, in the city of Glasgow. She studied English Language and Literature at the University of Edinburgh. She graduated in 1978 with a First Class Honours degree.

Career
Magnusson started her career in journalism at The Scotsman newspaper in Edinburgh in 1979 and then the Sunday Standard in Glasgow as a news/feature writer. In 1982, she became Scottish Feature Writer of the Year. She later joined BBC Scotland to present the weekly TV show Current Account. Magnusson moved to London to present Sixty Minutes, the BBC's successor to Nationwide, for network television. Following the shows demise, she presented London Plus for a year.

In October 1986, Magnusson joined BBC One's Breakfast Time as one of the main presenters. In 1987 she was part of the Breakfast Time team, including Frank Bough, Jeremy Paxman and Peter Snow, which covered the results of the general election. From 1989 onwards, she co-presented the programme's replacement, Breakfast News, initially with Laurie Mayer, and in later years, with Justin Webb.

In 1996, she won a Scottish Bafta for her commentary on the BBC's Dunblane: A Community Remembers, and in 1998 was awarded a Royal Television Society award for her exclusive television interview with Earl Spencer, Diana: My Sister the Princess. Magnusson narrated the Q.E.D. documentary Saving Trudy in 1999. 

As a reporter, she covered the 1997, 2001 and 2005 General Elections, as well as the funeral of Diana, Princess of Wales and the opening of the new Scottish Parliament. She also commentated for the BBC on the funerals of the inaugural First Minister of Scotland Donald Dewar, Cardinal Basil Hume and Cardinal Thomas Winning. Magnusson has presented many television programmes, ranging from Panorama to Songs of Praise. In 2005 she joined BBC Two's The Daily Politics as its Friday presenter. 

In 1997, Magnusson returned to Glasgow and became a main presenter for BBC Scotland's news programme Reporting Scotland. She shared the role with Jackie Bird and now Laura Miller and presents the programme's Thursday and Friday edition.

Books
Magnusson is the author of Life of Pee: The Story of How Urine Got Everywhere. She has also written books about the Scottish runner Eric Liddell, who refused to run on the Sabbath day due to his Christian beliefs, and about the Cornish Christian poet Jack Clemo and his marriage to Ruth Peaty.

Magnusson wrote the children's book Horace and the Haggis Hunter, which was illustrated by her husband, Norman Stone.

The Seal Woman's Gift, Magnusson's first novel for adults, was published in February 2018.

The Ninth Child, her second novel, published in 2020, is set in 19th-century Scotland, weaving folklore and Victorian social history.

Personal life
Magnusson is married to Norman Stone, a TV director, she is the mother of the Scottish film director Jamie Magnus Stone, and has four other children. She lives in the village of Torrance, East Dunbartonshire.

Awards and honours
She has received Honorary degrees from several institutions: in 2009 a Doctorate of Letters from Glasgow Caledonian University, in 2015 an honorary degree from the University of Stirling and from the Open University on 29 October 2016. In 2007 the Institute of Contemporary Scotland awarded her a place in the Scottish Academy of Merit for services to the media.

Publications

References

External links

Sunday Morning (BBC Radio Scotland)

1955 births
Alumni of the University of Edinburgh
BBC Scotland newsreaders and journalists
BBC Radio Scotland presenters
British reporters and correspondents
British women television journalists
Living people
Mass media people from Glasgow
Scottish Christians
Scottish television presenters
Scottish women television presenters
Scottish people of Icelandic descent
People from East Dunbartonshire
Scottish non-fiction writers
Scottish women radio presenters